The 2019 Vuelta a Burgos is a men's road bicycle race which takes place from 13 August to 17 August 2019. It is the 41st edition of the Vuelta a Burgos stage race, which was established in 1946. The race is rated as a 2.HC event and forms part of the 2019 UCI Europe Tour. The race is made up of five stages.

Teams
Eighteen teams entered the race. Each team had a maximum of seven riders:

UCI WorldTeams

 
 
 
 

UCI Professional Continental Teams

 
 
 
 
 
 
 
 
 
 
 

UCI Continental Teams

Route

Stages

Stage 1
13 August 2019 – Burgos to Burgos,

Stage 2
14 August 2019 – Gumiel de Izán to Lerma,

Stage 3
15 August 2019 – Sargentes de La Lora to Picón Blanco (Espinosa de los Monteros),

Stage 4
16 August 2019 – Atapuerca to Clunia,

Stage 5

Classification leadership

Classification standings

General classification

Points classification

Mountains classification

Young rider classification

Teams classification

References

External links

2019
2019 UCI Europe Tour
2019 in Spanish road cycling
August 2019 sports events in Spain